Seforong is a community council located in the Quthing District of Lesotho. Its population in 2006 was 9,720.

Villages
The community of Seforong includes the villages of Aupolasi, Bethane, Ha 'Malitlhare, Ha 'Mampiletso, Ha 'Ngoae, Ha Filane, Ha Kokoropo, Ha Leihloana, Ha Lesholu, Ha Mabusetsa, Ha Maime, Ha Maisa, Ha Mankata, Ha Mankata (Khohlong), Ha Mankata (Thabana-Tšooana), Ha Mapuleng, Ha Masupha, Ha Monese, Ha Monoto, Ha Mosi, Ha Motebang, Ha Motiki, Ha Motseleli, Ha Motšoane, Ha Nkati, Ha Polaki, Ha Potso, Ha Ramoroba, Ha Ramotloang, Ha Ranyathelaha, Ha Ratšitso, Ha Sekilane, Ha Sekoati, Ha Sello, Ha Selonyane, Ha Seqotomela, Ha Shao, Ha Teleka, Ha Tibisi, Ha Tšita, Ha Welephi (Sekoaing), Kamora Thaba, Lehonyeling, Letlapeng, Letsoapong, Lichecheng, Liphafeng, Litšoeneng, Mabeleteng, Makhetheng, Malosong, Maqomeng, Meeling, Motse-Mocha, Phocha, Pontšeng, Porotong, Sehlabaneng, Sekoaing, Sekokoaneng, Swatsi, Tafoleng (Ha Leihloana), Thaba-Chitja, Thaba-Chitja (Liphookoaneng), Thaba-Chitja (Mpharane), Thabang (Ha Leihloana), Thobai and Toalaneng (Toalaneng).

References

External links
 Google map of community villages

Populated places in Quthing District